Tabitha M. Benney is a Professor in the University of Utah's Department of Political Science and affiliated faculty in the Environmental and Sustainability Studies Program, Latin American Studies, International Studies, Asian Studies, and the Center on Global Change and Sustainability.

Career 
Benney teaches in the fields of International Relations, International and Comparative Political Economy, Energy and Environmental Politics, Public Policy, and Research Methods.  Her multidisciplinary research maps interactions within complex coupled systems to develop research-based policy solutions to address a range of technical issues. Benney's current research agenda is focused on health disparities and inequality related to the impacts of energy, climate, and air quality in urban areas.

She works with an interdisciplinary team at the University of Utah that studies air quality, energy, and climate change impacts on inequality and health disparities at varying scales (international, national, county, and zip code levels). Benney is also an expert in emerging areas of political economy that focus on energy coalitions, global currency flows, and low carbon energy transitions.

Benney received the Louis G. Lancaster's International Relations Award, the Interdisciplinary Research Pilot Program (IRPP) Grant, the Betty Glad Research Grant, the International Studies Association (ISA) Catalytic Research Workshop Grant, and, most recently, the Emerging COVID-19/SARS-CoV-2 Health Science Research Grant.

Research work
Benney research is focused on the intersection of International Political Economy and Environmental Studies, and her interdisciplinary research uses a wide range of research methods and designs to study governance issues at a range of spatial scales. Benney's current research is centered around the inconsistent distribution of environmental injustice and human health issues stemming from environmental degradation in urban areas.

Selected publications 
 Daniel Mendoza, Tabitha M. Benney, Ryan Bares, and Erik T Crosman (forthcoming) "Intra-city variability of fine particulate matter during COVID-19 lockdown: A case study from Park City, Utah," in Environmental Research
 Daniel Mendoza, Tabitha M. Benney and Sarah Boll (2021), "Long-term Analysis of the Relationships between Indoor and Outdoor Fine Particulate Pollution:  A Case Study Using Research Grade Sensors." Science of the Total Environment, 776:145778
 Benney, Tabitha M., Philip Singer, Robbie Chaney, and Chantel Sloan (2020) "Utah Air Quality Risk and Behavioral Action Survey,"
 Betsill, Michele; Benney, Tabitha M.; Gerlak, Andrea K. (Editors) (2020) Agency in Earth System Governance, Cambridge University Press.
 Betsill, Michele; Benney, Tabitha M.; Gerlak, Andrea K. (Editors) (2020) Agency in Earth System Governance Dataset, Cambridge University Press.
 Daniel Mendoza, Martin Buchert, Tabitha M. Benney, and John Lin (2020) "The Impact of Media and Environmental Variables on Transit Ridership," Vehicles (August 12) 2, 507–522.
 Froestad, Jan and Benney, Tabitha M. (2019) "China: A Green Energy Fulcrum?" in Environmental and Planning Law (Thomson Reuters) 36: 605-618.
 Benney, Tabitha M. (2019) "Renewable Energy and the Varieties of Capitalism in Emerging Economies," in Journal of Economic Policy Reform (DOI: 10.1080/17487870.2019.1637584).
 Benney, Tabitha M. (2018) "Climate Change, Sustainable Development, and Vulnerability" in B. Steele and E. Heinze (Eds.), Routledge Handbook on Ethics in International Relations. New York, NY: Routledge Press.
 Benney, Tabitha M. (2016) "The Challenge of Putting a Price on Carbon Emissions in the United States," Carbon Equity Forum, Rockefeller Foundation/Scholars Strategy Network, 1-9.
 Benney, Tabitha M. (2015) Making Environmental Markets Work: The Varieties of Capitalism in Emerging Economies. New York, NY: Routledge Press.
 Cohen, Benjamin J. and Benney, Tabitha M. (2015) "Currency Competition Today," in Currency Power: Understanding Monetary Rivalry, Princeton University Press, 135-159.
 Cohen, Benjamin J. and Benney, Tabitha M. (2014) "What Does the International Currency System Really Look Like?" in Review of International Political Economy, 21(5): 1017-1041.
 Pulver, Simone and Benney, Tabitha M. (2013) "Private-Sector Responses to Climate Change in the Global South." Wiley Interdisciplinary Reviews: Climate Change, 4(6): 479–496.

References 

Living people
Georgetown University alumni
University of California, Santa Barbara alumni
University of Utah faculty
Year of birth missing (living people)
Political economists
Climate economists